Laura Goode (born 1983) is an American author, novelist, essayist, poet, screenwriter, producer, and feminist. She is the author of the young adult novel Sister Mischief, the co-writer and producer of the feature film Farah Goes Bang, and writes the ANTIHEROINES column for Bright Ideas Magazine. She lives in San Francisco.

Early life

Goode was raised in Edina, Minnesota, a suburb of Minneapolis–Saint Paul which provided the inspiration for Sister Mischief's fictional setting of Holyhill, Minnesota. From 1995-1998, Goode competed in Minnesota's regional and state spelling bees. She graduated from Edina High School in 2002, received her B.A. in English and Comparative Literature from Columbia College, Columbia University in 2006, and received her M.F.A. in Writing from Columbia's School of the Arts in 2008.

Career

Goode's first novel for young adults, Sister Mischief, was released by Candlewick Press in 2011. The book centers around a Jewish lesbian teenager named Esme who starts a hip-hop group with her friends in the fictional town of Holyhill, Minnesota. Goode was inspired to write the book because of her "love for young people, and my frustration with the lack of strong literary role models for young women of all different cultural backgrounds and sexual identities." Sister Mischief was a 2012 Best of the Bay pick by the San Francisco Bay Guardian, a top 10 selection of the American Library Association's Rainbow List for excellence in GLBTQ YA literature, and a selection of the ALA's Amelia Bloomer List for excellence in feminist YA literature.

While an undergraduate at Columbia, Goode met and became friends with Meera Menon, who starred in a play Goode wrote. Later, Goode and Menon co-wrote the feature film Farah Goes Bang, which Menon directed and Goode produced. Farah Goes Bang premiered at the 2013 Tribeca Film Festival, where it was awarded the inaugural $25,000 Nora Ephron Prize by Tribeca and Vogue. Farah Goes Bang also won the Comcast Narrative Competition at CAAMFest. Goode designed and executed a Kickstarter campaign for the movie, which raised $81,160 for production of the film. Farah Goes Bang's distribution was facilitated by Seed&Spark and released at retail in April 2015.

Goode's essays, poems, and fiction have appeared in Bright Ideas Magazine, where she is a columnist and contributing editor, New York Magazine, the Los Angeles Review of Books, The Believer: Logger, Scratch, Vela, Vol. 1 Brooklyn, The Rumpus, BOMB, The Millions, Boston Review, The New Inquiry, IndieWire, Dossier, Fawlt, and anthologies including Starry Eyed: 16 Stories That Steal The Spotlight and Please Excuse This Poem: 100 Poets for the Next Generation.

Personal life 
Goode is married to Patrick Cushing, CEO of WorkHands. Their son Josiah was born in April 2014.

Works 
 Sister Mischief (young adult novel, 2011)
 Farah Goes Bang (screenplay, 2013)
 Become A Name (poetry, 2016)

Awards 
 For Sister Mischief
 Best of the Bay, San Francisco Bay Guardian 2012
 Top 10 selection of American Library Association's Rainbow List for excellence in GLBTQ YA literature 2012
 For Farah Goes Bang
 Norah Ephron Prize, Tribeca Film Festival 2013
 Comcast Narrative Competition, CAAMFest
 Bud Abbott Award for Feature Length Comedy, Garden State Film Festival 2014
 Best Narrative Feature, Austin Asian American Film Festival 2014

References

1983 births
Living people
21st-century American novelists
American women novelists
21st-century American poets
American women poets
American feminists
21st-century American women writers
People from Edina, Minnesota
Screenwriters from Minnesota
Columbia College (New York) alumni
Columbia University School of the Arts alumni
21st-century American screenwriters